Dielsdorf District is a district in the northwestern part of the Swiss canton of Zürich. 

Since 1871 the administrative center of the district is located in Dielsdorf. Previously the district was named Bezirk Regensberg, and its capital was Regensdorf, the only city in the district.

Municipalities

See also 
Municipalities of the canton of Zürich

References

Districts of the canton of Zürich